Egil á Bø (born 2 April 1974, né Egil Zachariasen) is a Faroese football defender who plays for EB/Streymur and the Faroe Islands national football team. Bø scored his first goal for the national team in a 3-1 defeat in Piatra Neamţ to Romania. Egil á Bø was previously known as Egil Zachariassen, he changed his family name a few years ago.

Club career 

Egil á Bø has played for several Faroese football clubs:

 2005- EB/Streymur
 2004 B36 Tórshavn
 2003 EB/Streymur
 1999-2002 B36 Tórshavn
 1996-1998 ÍF Fuglafjørður
 1995 NSÍ Runavík
 1993-94 EB/Streymur
 1991-92 Streymur

International career 
Egil is the oldest ever Faroese international debutant, having played the first game for his country in an away friendly with Portugal at the age of 34 years, 4 months and 18 days.

International goals
Scores and results list Faroe Islands' goal tally first.

References

External links 
Egil á Bø's profile on EB/Streymur's official website (in Faroese)
Egil á Bø's profile on FaroeSoccer.com
Profile at national-football-teams.com

1974 births
Living people
People from Tórshavn
Faroese footballers
Association football defenders
Faroe Islands international footballers
EB/Streymur players
B36 Tórshavn players
ÍF Fuglafjørður players
NSÍ Runavík players
Faroe Islands Premier League players